Nwankwo is a given name and a surname. Notable people with the name include:

Given name
Nwankwo Kanu, OON (born 1976), Nigerian footballer
Nwankwo Obiora (born 1991), Nigerian footballer
Nwankwo Tochukwu (born 1986), Nigerian footballer

Surname
Christy Nwankwo, Rivers State Judge
Ike Nwankwo (born 1973), Nigerian-American basketball player
Nkem Nwankwo (1936–2001), Nigerian novelist and poet
Simeon Nwankwo (born 1992), Nigerian footballer